In mathematics, more specifically ring theory and the theory of nil ideals, Levitzky's theorem, named after Jacob Levitzki, states that in a right Noetherian ring, every nil one-sided ideal is necessarily nilpotent.

Proof
This is Utumi's argument as it appears in 

Lemma
Assume that R satisfies the ascending chain condition on annihilators of the form  where a is in R. Then
 Any nil one-sided ideal is contained in the lower nil radical Nil*(R);
 Every nonzero nil right ideal contains a nonzero nilpotent right ideal.
 Every nonzero nil left ideal contains a nonzero nilpotent left ideal.

Levitzki's Theorem 
Let R be a right Noetherian ring. Then every nil one-sided ideal of R is nilpotent. In this case, the upper and lower nilradicals are equal, and moreover this ideal is the largest nilpotent ideal among nilpotent right ideals and among nilpotent left ideals.

Proof: In view of the previous lemma, it is sufficient to show that the lower nilradical of R is nilpotent. Because R is right Noetherian, a maximal nilpotent ideal N exists. By maximality of N, the quotient ring R/N has no nonzero nilpotent ideals, so R/N is a semiprime ring. As a result, N contains the lower nilradical of R. Since the lower nilradical contains all nilpotent ideals, it also contains N, and so N is equal to the lower nilradical. Q.E.D.

See also
Nilpotent ideal
Köthe conjecture
Jacobson radical

Notes

References
 
 
 
 
 
 

Theorems in ring theory